"Let the River Run" is a song written, composed, and performed by American singer-songwriter Carly Simon, and the theme to the 1988 Mike Nichols film Working Girl. 

The song won the Academy Award for Best Original Song, the Golden Globe Award for Best Original Song (tying with "Two Hearts" by Phil Collins and Lamont Dozier from Buster), and the Grammy Award for Best Song Written Specifically for a Motion Picture or Television. Simon became the first artist in history to win this trio of awards for a song composed and written, as well as performed, entirely by a single artist.

The Working Girl soundtrack was released in 1989 and peaked at No. 45 on the Billboard 200, and also contains a choral version of the track featuring The St. Thomas Choir of Men and Boys of New York City.

Composition and reception
Simon has stated that she found inspiration for the lyrics by first reading the original script, and then the poems of Walt Whitman. Musically, she wanted to write a hymn to New York with a contemporary jungle beat under it, so as to juxtapose those opposites in a compelling way.
A statement on Simon's official website acknowledges that "the phrases 'Silver Cities Rise' and 'The New Jerusalem' seem to have taken on a new meaning for many people, but the song was not originally composed with any particular political and/or religious overtones." However, the phrase "new Jerusalem" has been recognized by other observers as an allusion to the works of William Blake.

A music video for the song was filmed and released, featuring Simon, along with Working Girl actresses Melanie Griffith and Joan Cusack, aboard the Staten Island Ferry. As a single, the song reached peak positions of No. 49 on the Billboard Hot 100 and No. 11 on the Billboard Adult Contemporary chart in 1989. The song remains one of Simon's best loved and most recognizable hits, and has been featured on multiple compilations of her work, including the three-disc box set Clouds in My Coffee (1995), the UK import The Very Best of Carly Simon: Nobody Does It Better (1998), the two-disc retrospective Anthology (2002), the single-disc Reflections: Carly Simon's Greatest Hits (2004), and Sony Music's Playlist: The Very Best of Carly Simon (2014).

Cash Box said that it "is perhaps the most powerful songwriting Simon has ever done. A broken drum feel underscores a brilliant anthem for the working class. The gospel-tinged melody soars, inspires; the lyric conjures visions of a nation only needing to let the river of hope run its course. Simon delivers a remarkable vocal, filled with passionate intensity."

Awards
Simon became the first artist in history to win a Grammy Award, a Golden Globe Award, and an Academy Award for a song composed and written, as well as performed, entirely by a single artist.

Legacy

"Let the River Run" is the first of only two songs to have won all three major awards (Oscar, Golden Globe, Grammy) while being composed and written, as well as performed, entirely by a single artist – the other being "Streets of Philadelphia" by Bruce Springsteen from Philadelphia. Barbra Streisand shared the Oscar, Golden Globe and Grammy for "Evergreen (Love Theme from A Star is Born)" which she composed and wrote with lyricist Paul Williams (for which she also won the Grammy Award for Best Female Pop Vocal Performance). Annie Lennox won all three awards – for "Into the West" from The Lord of the Rings: The Return of the King, sharing all three with co-composer and lyricists Fran Walsh and Howard Shore. More recently, Adele received the Oscar, Golden Globe, and Grammy for her "Skyfall" theme, co-written with producer Paul Epworth for the 2012 James Bond film Skyfall.

In 2001, the song was used for an advertisement for the United States Postal Service in the wake of the 2001 anthrax attacks.

In 2004, the song was twice featured in the film Little Black Book, Simon herself also appeared at the end of the film. That same year, the song was ranked at No. 91 in AFI's 100 Years...100 Songs.

In 2009, Simon re-recorded the song for her album Never Been Gone. On September 11 of that year, Simon performed the song with her children, Sally Taylor and Ben Taylor, at the World Trade Center site to honor the lives lost in the destruction of the Twin Towers eight years earlier.

In 2014, Simon released a single of the song covered by Máiréad Carlin and Damian McGinty which had been the anthem for Derry~Londonderry's UK City of Culture celebrations. McGinty and Carlin sang the song with Simon during the Oceana Partners Awards Gala in Beverly Hills, Ca.

In January 2019, the song was the subject of an episode of BBC Radio 4's Soul Music, examining the song's cultural influence.

In October 2019, the song was used behind the closing credits of Season 31, Episode 2 of the Fox TV show The Simpsons.

In October 2019, as well as being the episode title, the song was used during several key moments during the first episode of Season 2 of Castle Rock.

Track listing
7" single 
 "Let The River Run" – 3:40
 "The Turn Of The Tide" – 4:04

Personnel

 Vivian Cherry - vocals (background)
 Kacey Cisyk - vocals (background)
 Mickey Curry - drums
 Frank Filipetti - mixing
 Frank Floyd - vocals (background)
 Gordon Grody - vocals (background)
 Lani Groves - vocals (background)
 Tim Leitner - engineer
 Rob Mounsey - keyboards, producer
 Jimmy Ryan - guitar
 Frank Simms - vocals (background)
 Carly Simon - producer, vocals
 Vaneese Thomas - vocals (background)
 Kurt Yaghjian - vocals (background)

Charts

References

External links
 Carly Simon's Official website
 Let the River Run video on YouTube

1988 songs
1989 singles
1980s ballads
Best Original Song Academy Award-winning songs
Best Original Song Golden Globe winning songs
Grammy Award for Best Song Written for Visual Media
Songs written for films
Carly Simon songs
Songs written by Carly Simon
Arista Records singles